Čichalov is a municipality and village in Karlovy Vary District in the Karlovy Vary Region of the Czech Republic. It has about 200 inhabitants.

Administrative parts
Villages of Kovářov, Mokrá and Štoutov are administrative parts of Čichalov.

References

Villages in Karlovy Vary